Conor Carty (born 25 May 2002) is an Irish footballer who plays as a forward for League of Ireland Premier Division side St Patrick's Athletic, on loan from League One side Bolton Wanderers.

Career
Carty initially played Gaelic football, playing for Wicklow GAA at county level. He first got involved in football at the age of 14 when he signed for Dublin club St Francis. He came through the Wolverhampton Wanderers Academy, after joining in 2017. He signed his first professional contract with Wolverhampton Wanderers on 17 April 2020, penning a one-year deal. On 23 April 2021, Carty renewed his contract at Molineux for a further year. Upon the expiration of his deal, he joined Bolton Wanderers on 17 June 2022, linking up with the newly formed 'B' team.

Carty made his Bolton debut on 20 September 2022 in a 2–2 draw against Tranmere Rovers  in the EFL Trophy, coming on in the 84th minute as a substitute for Eoin Toal, and went onto score the equalising goal seven minutes later. Tranmere went on to win the Penalty shoot-out, however.

On 21 October 2022, Carty was loaned out to National League side Oldham Athletic on loan for a month. He made five appearances for The Latics before returning to Bolton Wanderers, and on 18 November, he was sent out on loan to fellow National League side Gateshead until January 2023. On 9 January 2023, after he made four league appearances, scoring once; Carty's loan with The Heed came to an end and he once again returned to the University of Bolton Stadium.

On 4 February 2023, Carty returned to the Republic of Ireland  as he joined League of Ireland Premier Division side, St Patrick's Athletic on loan until 30 November; upon his arrival he was given the number 15 shirt for the upcoming campaign.

Career statistics

References

Living people
2002 births
Association football forwards
Republic of Ireland association footballers
Expatriate footballers in England
English Football League players
National League (English football) players
League of Ireland players
Wolverhampton Wanderers F.C. players
Bolton Wanderers F.C. players
Oldham Athletic A.F.C. players
Gateshead F.C. players
St Patrick's Athletic F.C. players